Chris Quick (born 2 August 1988) is a Scottish editor and producer of independent films. His editing credits includes Autumn Never Dies, In Search of La Che, Mountain and The Greyness of Autumn which also marked his directorial debut. In July 2019, he became the director of the Glasgow Filmmakers Alliance

Career

Quick Off The Mark Productions (2009 to 2016)
Originally starting in theatre, Quick made the move to video editing in 2007 when he studied television production at the Glasgow Metropolitan College (now City of Glasgow College). It is here that he first met Mark D. Ferguson and Andy S. McEwan and formed a close working relationship with the pair. After graduating in 2009, he co-founded Quick Off The Mark Productions with Ferguson and began working in corporate advertising videos. In 2010, the pair were reunited with McEwan when they began development of what would become their first feature film, In Search of La Che. Starring Duncan Airlie James in his first leading role as an actor, the spoof mockumentary followed John Tavish on his quest to track down fictional rock star Roxy La Che. English actor, Steve Nallon also made a guest appearance in the film as former British Prime Minister Margaret Thatcher. The film premiered at the Glasgow Film Theatre on 9 November 2011 with the cast and crew in attendance as well as an unexpected appearance form Scottish actor Peter Mullan.

In 2012, Quick made his directorial debut with the short comedy The Greyness of Autumn which he co wrote with McEwan. The film, starring Duncan Airlie James again in the starring role, followed the story of Danny McGuire, a depressed ostrich living in Glasgow. The film received good reviews upon its release in both the United Kingdom and abroad. Canadian review site Pretty Clever Films wrote: 

Throughout 2013, The Greyness of Autumn appeared at a number of festivals in the United Kingdom including the Edinburgh Short Film Festival and the Deep Fried Film Festival. Internationally, the film was screened in various countries including the United States where it featured in the Big Little Comedy Festival. It was also shown at the Dublin Short Film & Music Festival in Ireland. In 2014, The Greyness of Autumn also made an unexpected return to the festival circuit in 2014 appearing in the Southern Colorado Film Festival and the Portobello Film Festival. In the same month, the film also made an appearance at the Barossa Film Festival in Australia after narrowly missing out in the selection process for the 2013 edition. 2015 saw the film return to Australia when it received the Best Short Comedy accolade at the People of Passion film festival.

Quick returned to the directors chair in 2014 to direct a short children's film for a competition run by Vue Cinemas. The competition involved filmmakers from Glasgow creating three films out of scripts written by children at a local school. The project was led by Steve Johnson of Futurist Films with Quick directing the short film Minion Vs Minion and Matthew Cowan of Production Attic Ltd directing Princess Butterfly and Arianna.

After nearly seven years in business it was announced on 14 October 2015 that Quick Off The Mark Productions would be closing due to Ferguson's decision to move to Canada. The company ceased trading on 19 February 2016 and was formally closed by Companies House on 7 June 2016.

Freelance Career (2013 to Present)
2013 saw Quick begin to work outside of Quick Off The Mark Productions for the first time. He edited the short film Sectarian Secret Police for Partickular Films in Glasgow. The film, directed by Joseph Andrew Mclean was shown alongside The Greyness of Autumn at the Loch Ness Film Festival in July 2013.

In 2014, Quick was involved in two short film simultaneously. January saw filming begin on  Glory Hunter. At the same time, Chris was piecing together the final edit of Broken Record, the directorial debut for Andy S. McEwan. Broken Record appeared at various film festivals including the Portobello Film Festival in London.

Throughout 2014, Quick worked on the short Sci Fi film Electric Faces directed by Johnny Herbin. Initially, Quick was brought on board to produce the film but was also later offered the task of editing the film as well. The film tells the story of a recovering addict's plan to commit the perfect robbery but is thrown into chaos by a cantankerous bank guard and an increasingly unstable robot. Quick expressed his admiration for the work done by the cast and crew on Electric Faces. In particular, he praised lead actor Euan Bennet for taking on a mammoth task so early in his acting training and director of photography Darren Eggenschwiler for his expert knowledge in the field of cinematography. He also stated that Johnny Herbin had 'the makings of a great director.' The film went on to receive a Best Writer nomination for Herbin at the 2016 British Academy Scotland New Talent Awards.

When Quick Off The Mark Productions disbanded in 2016, Quick launched Suited Caribou Media, providing post production and photography services to independent films across Scotland. Some of his photography work has appeared in the UK print publication Digital Filmmaker Magazine.

In 2017, Quick once again teamed up with Johnny Herbin to work on the short war film Mountain. The film was released in 2018 and earned Quick his first award win for editing at the 2018 Dublin Independent Film Festival. He would later go on to be nominated a further 3 times for Best Editor.

Quick's next big project came in the form of a sequel to The Greyness of Autumn. The film took many years to accomplish with talks with Andy S. McEwan about a possible script starting in early 2014. In 2015, a script was finally agreed upon and a successful crowd funding campaign raised £1,505 from 44 backers including former Gamesmaster host Dominik Diamond. Filming began in 2016 with Steve Johnson joining the production of Director of Photography. The film was heavily delayed in post production but was eventually released on World Puppetry Day in 2020. The film opened to positive reviews with many praising the films script and direction. Jolly Moel of Screen Critix wrote"

Quick received his first nomination for directing for the film in 2021. In an interview at the Unrestricted View Film Festival, Quick hinted that a possible television show based on Autumn Never Dies was being explored and that Channel 4 was being targeted as a potential host for the series.

Glasgow Filmmakers Alliance

Quick co-founded the Glasgow Filmmakers Alliance with actor Andrew O'Donnell in October 2011. The non-profit organisation hosts an online database with the details of film industry professionals and companies operating in and around the city of Glasgow.

A supporter of independent film, Quick led a campaign to get the British Academy Scotland New Talent Awards recognised by IMDB stating that 'they represented the best of emerging Scottish talent'. The campaign was successful and the awards were introduced to the site later that year. He later repeated this success with the inclusion of the Virgin Media Short Awards after the first double win by Scottish director John McPhail with his film Just Say Hi.

In 2014, Quick and O'Donnell wrote an open letter on behalf of the independent filmmakers of Glasgow to the director of BAFTA Scotland, Jude MacLaverty. In the letter, the pair asked the film body to consider a proposal of including three new awards at the annual ceremony aimed at low budget / independent filmmakers. On 28 October it was announced that the proposal would be placed on the agenda of the next Bafta Scotland Committee meeting in December 2014.

On 2 April 2015, the BAFTA Scotland committee released their response to the proposals put forward by the Glasgow Filmmakers Alliance.

In March 2017, Quick along with other industry professionals, signed the open letter to the Arts Council, England, objecting to the organisations decision not to renew the visa for American born actor Tyler Collins.

On 25 April 2019, O'Donnell announced that he would be standing down as director of the Glasgow Filmmakers Alliance. In May, it was announced that Quick would take his place as director with Gary McLellan taking over as deputy director.

Personal life
Became a member of BAFTA Scotland in 2012.

Was a member of the British Labour Party from July 2011 to March 2015.

Together with Andy S. McEwan, he considered bidding to represent the United Kingdom at the 2014 Eurovision Song Contest as the puppet Nelson from The Greyness of Autumn.

Joined the Guild of British Film and Television Editors in December 2017.

Revealed on 23 May 2018 that he is gay.

Filmography

Awards

See also 
Glasgow Filmmakers Alliance
Suited Caribou Media
Quick Off The Mark Productions
Autumn Never Dies
The Greyness of Autumn

References

External links

Chris Quick Official Website
Glasgow Filmmakers Alliance

1988 births
Gay screenwriters
Scottish gay writers
LGBT film producers
Living people
Film people from Glasgow
Scottish film directors
Scottish film editors
Scottish film producers
Scottish male voice actors
Scottish male screenwriters
Scottish LGBT screenwriters
Scottish comedy writers
21st-century Scottish LGBT people